Vicente Archer (born 1975 in Woodstock, New York ) is an American jazz musician (double bass).

Life and work 
Archer began in self-taught guitar for 16 years and studied at the New England Conservatory in Boston, MA with Gene Bertfocinio, Jerry Bergonzi and Danilo Perez. Archer left for a year to study the bass guitar at Northeastern University. Soon he was discovered by Donald Harrison and Eric Reed and taken on tour. In the following years he played with musicians such as Terence Blanchard, Kenny Garrett, Wynton Marsalis/Lincoln Center Jazz Orchestra, Stanley Jordan and Stefon Harris. Archer recorded with Donald Harrison in 1998 (Free to Be, Impulse!). In 2000 Archer completed his business studies in Management Information Systems and Business Management and moved to New York City.

From the 2000s Archer played with Louis Hayes' Cannonball Legacy Band, Marcus Printup, Nicholas Payton, Myron Walden, George Colligan, Jaleel Shaw,. Walter Smith III, Robert Glasper, Chihiro Yamanaka,  Marcus Strickland, and John Scofield.

In the 2010s, he also worked on recordings of Bruce Barth, Norah Jones, Matthew Stevens and the Black Art Jazz Collective. In the field of jazz he was involved in 47 recording sessions between 1998 and 2017.

Discography 
 Bruce Barth Trio: Live at Smalls (SmallsLIVE, 2011), with Rudy Royston
Black Art Jazz Collective: Presented by the Side Door Jazz Club (Sunnyside Records, 2016), with Jeremy Pelt, Wayne Escoffery, Xavier Davis, James Burton III and Jonathan Blake
 John Scofield: Combo 66 (Verve, 2018)

References

External links 
 Porträt bei Whirlwind Recordings
 Allmusic - Vicente Archer
 Discogs - Vicente Archer

African-American jazz musicians
1975 births
Living people
Northeastern University alumni
Jazz musicians from New York (state)
21st-century African-American people
20th-century African-American people